The 2017 Men's Ford National Hockey League was the 19th edition of the men's field hockey tournament. The competition was held in Wellington, New Zealand, from 16 to 24 September.

North Harbour won the title for the fifth time, defeating Auckland 5–3 in the final. Capital finished in third place after winning the bronze medal match 6–1 against Southern.

Participating teams
The following eight teams competed for the title:

 Auckland
 Canterbury
 Capital
 Central
 Midlands
 Northland
 North Harbour
 Southern

Results

Preliminary round

Pool A

Pool B

Classification round

Quarter-finals

Fifth to eighth place classification

Crossover

Seventh and eighth place

Fifth and sixth place

First to fourth place classification

Semi-finals

Third and fourth place

Final

Statistics

Final standings

Goalscorers

References

External links
Official website

National Hockey League
New Zealand National Hockey League seasons